Yannick Ricardo Elliott (born 15 June 1986) is a Jamaican cricketer. Elliott is a right-handed batsman who bowls right-arm off break. He was born in Kingston, Surrey County.

Elliott made his debut for Jamaica in a List A match against Barbados in November 2008. He played a further List A match, coming later in November 2008 against Trinidad and Tobago. In his first match against Barbados, he scored 7 runs before being run out by Kenroy Williams. With the ball he bowled 10 wicket-less overs, although conceding just 17 runs. In his second match against Trinidad and Tobago, he scored 6 runs before being dismissed by Kieron Pollard. With the ball, he took his first List A wicket, that of Gibran Mohammed for the cost of 29 runs from 10 overs. He was also apart Jamaica winning team in the 2011 regional super 50 tournament. Elliott went on to play one more super 50 game and two t20 for Jamaica before he suffered a mild stroke in 2013, he never played back since 

Elliott has played club cricket in England for Gravesend Cricket Club in the Kent Cricket League during the 2010,2012 and 2014 seasons, and foxton cricket club in 2016,18

References

External links
Yannick Elliott at ESPNcricinfo
Yannick Elliott at CricketArchive

1986 births
Living people
Sportspeople from Kingston, Jamaica
Jamaican cricketers
Jamaica cricketers